Ekipa means "Team" or "The Team" in several Slavic languages. The word is closely related to the French word l'équipe which means the same. It may refer to:

 Ekipa (TV series), a 2007 Polish television drama series
 Ekipa (Serbia), a short-lived Serbian sports daily published for six months in 2005 
 Ekipa (Slovenia), a Slovenian sports daily established in 1995